The Williams FW11 was a Formula One car designed by Frank Dernie as a serious challenger to McLaren and their MP4/2C car.

The FW11's most notable feature was the Honda 1.5 Litre V6 turbo engine, one of the most powerful in F1 at the time producing 800 bhp at 12,000rpm and well over 1,200 bhp at 12,000 rpm in qualifying.

Added to the engine's power were the aerodynamics, which were ahead of the MP4/2C and the Lotus 98T. That and its excellent driving pairing of Nelson Piquet and Nigel Mansell made it a force to be reckoned with. The car was an instantly recognisable product of the turbo era of F1.

History

1986
In , the car won first time out in Brazil with Piquet, before Mansell laid down a title challenge with four wins. Williams were shaken by the near fatal road crash of Frank Williams which demoralised the team. Williams survived the crash but became a quadriplegic as a result, with the 1986 British Grand Prix the first time during the season he would appear in the Williams pits as he went through his rehabilitation. Patrick Head stepped up and managed the team until Williams returned late in the season. This may have caused the in-fighting between the two team mates, and the lost points helped Alain Prost take his second world championship. That and Mansell's spectacular blow out in the final race in Australia where all he had to do was finish third to win the title. The points built up between Piquet and Mansell were enough for Williams to take the constructors' championship, however.

Reportedly, both Nelson Piquet and Honda, whom it was rumored were paying the bulk of the Brazilian's USD$3.3 million retainer, left Australia angry with Head and Williams Management. Both Piquet and Honda believed that Williams should have reined in Mansell during races and forced him to give best to Piquet for race wins or higher points finishes, and thus an easier passage to the World Championship, something that both Piquet and Honda coveted.

1987
Honda were now supplying Lotus with the same engine supplied to Williams (though Lotus used the 1986 RA166E engine rather than the RA167E 1987 engine used by Williams), which helped Ayrton Senna challenge consistently, but the FW11's superiority told, and Piquet finished in the points (mostly on the podium) in every race other than San Marino (where he had a terrible crash at Tamburello during Friday practice, and he emerged with only a sore ankle, and he wanted to start the race but was prevented from doing so by F1 Medical boss, Prof. Sid Watkins who told him "You have a concussion, you can't race"), Belgium, and Australia, and he was champion. As for Mansell, he scored six victories including a memorable come from behind win at the British Grand Prix at Silverstone, passing Piquet for the lead with just 3 laps remaining. He scored twice as many wins as Piquet, but also had the lion's share of bad luck and unreliability. Piquet's third championship was assured after Mansell had a major crash during practice for the Japanese Grand Prix.

After much testing Piquet found the car to be superior to the conventionally suspended FW11B. The new suspension was an active suspension system similar to the one Lotus had been using all season on the Lotus 99T, but was renamed as Williams Reactive Ride due to the Lotus team having copyright on the 'Active Suspension' name for the system. The Williams engineered suspension was also lighter, less complicated and drew much less power from the Honda engine than did the Lotus example. The first time a hydraulic variant of the system was tested Dernie fitted it to a 1984 FW09, and during testing Piquet noted that although the car rode very smoothly, it handled very badly. So Dernie redesigned the system and hired Paddy Lowe and Steve Wise to design an electronic computerized system. In a race simulation test at the Imola circuit, driving a reactive suspension FW11B, Piquet completed 59 laps some 3 minutes faster than Mansell had done to win the Grand Prix at the circuit earlier in the year, though it was noted that he was also the only car on the circuit for the simulation and thus wasn't slowed by having to lap other cars. Still, his confidence in the new suspension was absolute and he first used it in competition at the Italian Grand Prix at Monza where it proved much faster than the passive suspension FW11B, allowing him to run with less wing and record the highest speed of the 1987 season when he was speed trapped at 218.807 mph (352.135 km/h), some 5 mph faster than Mansell could manage in the conventional suspension car. Piquet would start from the pole and win the race from the Lotus of Ayrton Senna, with Mansell unable to keep pace finishing 3rd. It took until the next race in Portugal before Mansell would try the reactive car during a Grand Prix weekend, although he only raced it during the Spanish Grand Prix at Jerez. There were also plans in 1987 to introduce a semi automatic transmission, but this never came to pass.

The FW11 was not a technical showcase by any means, but solid engineering, exceptional aerodynamics, the engine's outright power and superior fuel economy (even better than the TAG-Porsche engines used by McLaren), and Piquet and Mansell helped the car take 18 wins, 16 pole positions and 278 points over two seasons of racing.

It was believed there were two main reasons for this. Honda were unhappy with Williams management for allegedly not honoring the number 1 status contract of 'their' driver Nelson Piquet. Honda (and Piquet) believed that Williams should have ordered Nigel Mansell to give way to Piquet during races, and that their failure to do so cost Piquet the 1986 Drivers' Championship, and almost cost him the 1987 championship (though had Piquet not won in 1987, Mansell still would have given the Japanese company its first Drivers' Championship). While Mansell would stay with Williams for 1988, Piquet had announced during practice for the Hungarian Grand Prix that he would be moving to Lotus in 1988 as their undisputed number 1 driver, thus also staying with Honda. The second rumored reason why Honda left Williams a year before the contract ended was the team's refusal to dump Nigel Mansell from the driver line up and replace him with Satoru Nakajima in 1986 (Nakajima made his F1 debut with Lotus in 1987). Williams was proven correct as Nakajima would race 5 full seasons in F1 with Lotus (1987-1989) and Tyrrell (1990-1991) and would only score a total of 16 points from 74 starts, with a best race finish of two 4th places. Another reason Mansell was retained was that he was under contract with the team until the end of 1988.

An interim car that was tested before the FW11's successor FW12 was finished, the FW11C was used for the Judd V8 engine powering the FW12 in 1988. It was only built for testing purposes and it never raced.

Other
Mansell's FW11 was featured in the Japanese and American versions of the 2001 game Gran Turismo 3 under the alias F686/M. It was the most powerful Formula One car in the game, producing 939 PS (926 hp) (with an oil change it has 973 hp). It was also featured in the game Formula One 05 as an unlockable car. Piquet's FW11B was featured in the game Toca Race Driver 3.

Complete Formula One results
(key) (results shown in bold indicate pole position; results in italics indicate fastest lap)

References 

Williams FW11
1987 Formula One season cars
Formula One championship-winning cars